Ancistrus sericeus is a species of catfish in the family Loricariidae. It is native to South America, where it occurs in the basin of the Ampiyacu River, a tributary of the Amazon River, in Peru. The species reaches 5 cm (2 inches) SL.

References 

sericeus
Fish described in 1872
Fish of South America